Bolton High School is a public high school in Alexandria, Rapides Parish, Louisiana, United States. Bears are the school mascot.

History
It was a segregated school and African American students attended the Peabody Industrial School. Scott M. Brame became the school's principal in 1909.  

Kewaunee Manufacturing of Kewaunee, Wisconsin advertised it was supplying furniture and equipment for the new school building in 1915. A photo of the school is featured in the advertisement.

The Bolton High School building at 2101 Vance Ave. was constructed in 1926.  It was listed on the National Register of Historic Places in 1984.  It is Classical Revival in style and was designed by New Orleans architects Favrot & Livaudais.  According to its National Register nomination, the building "can be seen as the most urbane and sophisticated early-twentieth century building" in Rapides Parish.

In 1946, archery was added as an athletic program for girls at the school.

On November 7, 1957, a tornado three blocks away from the school caused a power failure during a performance of Madame Butterfly. The performance was canceled. Nobody was injured.

In 2019 a Career and Tech Center were added and a conservatory planned.

Athletics
Bolton High athletics competes in the LHSAA.

Notable alumni

 Errol Barron (b. 1941), architect and professor
 Daniel T. Barry (b. 1953), NASA astronaut
 Elliott Chaze (1915–1990), journalist and novelist
 Luther F. Cole (1925–2013), state politician and judge
 Bob Hamm (1934–2009), writer and poet
 Catherine D. Kimball (b. 1945), Chief Justice of the Louisiana Supreme Court
 Maxie Lambright (1924–`1980), football coach
 Gillis William Long (1923–1985), U.S. representative
 Harold B. McSween (1926–2002), U.S. representative
 Warren Morris (b. 1974), Major League Baseball player
 Ned Randolph (1942–2016), state politician
 Mickey Slaughter (b. 1941), quarterback in the American Football League
 Randy Thom (b. 1951), winner of two Oscars, one British Academy Award, and one French Academy Award for film sound

References

Public high schools in Louisiana
National Register of Historic Places in Rapides Parish, Louisiana
Buildings and structures completed in 1926